The Winston-Salem Cycling Classic is a one-day race held annually since 2013 in Winston-Salem, North Carolina in the United States. In 2019, it was rated as a 1.2 race by the Union Cycliste Internationale (UCI), and was part of the UCI America Tour.

Winners

Road race

Criterium

References

External links

Cycle races in the United States
2013 establishments in the United States
Recurring sporting events established in 2013
UCI America Tour races